Granite State is the nickname of the U.S. state of New Hampshire.

It may also refer to:

Granite State Challenge, television quiz game show on New Hampshire Public Television
Granite State College, part of the New Hampshire state university system
Granite State Communications, a private company in Weare, New Hampshire
Granite State Credit Union, a state-chartered credit union based in Manchester, New Hampshire
Granite State Electric Company, a New Hampshire subsidiary of Liberty Utilities
"Granite State" (Breaking Bad), the 15th episode of the fifth season of the American television series Breaking Bad
USS Granite State, the final name of a warship originally called USS New Hampshire (1864)